Tratalias is a comune (municipality) in the Province of South Sardinia in the Island of Sardinia, located about  southwest of Cagliari and about  southeast of Carbonia.

Tratalias borders the following municipalities: Carbonia, Giba, Perdaxius, Piscinas, San Giovanni Suergiu, Villaperuccio. The former cathedral of Santa Maria di Monserrato is an example of Sardinian Romanesque architecture. Built in 1213–82, it has a façade with two rows of Lombard bands and a rose window. The interior has a rectangular plan with a nave and two aisles, and a semicircular apse.

References

Cities and towns in Sardinia